Richard Dawson  (1932–2012) was an English-born American actor, comedian, game show host and panelist.

Richard Dawson may also refer to:

Richard Dawson (died 1766), Irish MP
Richard Dawson (British Army officer) (died c. 1800), soldier and administrator
Richard Dawson (1762–1807), Irish MP
Richard Thomas Dawson, 2nd Baron Cremorne (1788–1827), Irish MP and peer
Richard Dawson, 1st Earl of Dartrey (1817–1897), Anglo-Irish Liberal, and later Liberal Unionist, politician
Richard A. Dawson (1848–1906), American lawyer and politician
Richard Dawson (racehorse trainer) (1865–1955), owner and trainer of racehorses
Richard Dawson (1855–1923), Irish barrister and Conservative Party politician
Richard Dawson (footballer, born 1960) (born 1960), English professional footballer
Richard Dawson (footballer, born 1962) (born 1962), English professional footballer
Richard Dawson (footballer, born 1967) (born 1967), English professional footballer
Richard Dawson (cricketer) (born 1980), English cricketer
Richard Dawson (musician), English folk singer